The 1990 Tennessee Volunteers football team represented the University of Tennessee in the 1990 NCAA Division I-A football season. Playing as a member of the Southeastern Conference (SEC), the team was led by head coach Johnny Majors, in his 14th year, and played their home games at Neyland Stadium in Knoxville, Tennessee. They finished the season with a record of nine wins, two losses, and two ties (9–2–2 overall, 5–1–1 in the SEC), as SEC Champions and with a victory over Virginia in the Sugar Bowl. The Volunteers offense scored 465 points while the defense allowed 220 points.

Schedule

Game summaries

vs. Colorado

Team players drafted into the NFL

Reference:

References

Tennessee
Tennessee Volunteers football seasons
Southeastern Conference football champion seasons
Sugar Bowl champion seasons
Tennessee Volunteers football